The Reuben W. Robins House is a historic house at 508 Locust Street in Conway, Arkansas.  Built in 1928, it is a fine local example of Mission Revival architecture.  It is two stories in height, with a hipped red tile roof and a stuccoed exterior.  Most of its windows are rectangular sash, but there are a few round-arch windows in the Mission style.  The house was built for Reuben W. Robins, a prominent local attorney who also served on the Arkansas Supreme Court.

The house was listed on the National Register of Historic Places in 2005.

See also
National Register of Historic Places listings in Faulkner County, Arkansas

References

Houses on the National Register of Historic Places in Arkansas
Mission Revival architecture in Arkansas
Houses completed in 1928
Houses in Conway, Arkansas